The 3rd International Emmy Kids Awards ceremony, presented by the International Academy of Television Arts and Sciences (IATAS), took place on February 20, 2015 in New York City. The nominations were announced on October 8, 2014.

Ceremony information
Nominations for the 3rd International Emmy Kids Awards were announced on October 8, 2014 by the International Academy of Television Arts and Sciences (IATAS). The winners were announced on February 20, 2015 at a ceremony in New York City. The winners spanned series from Chile, France, Spain, Sweden, The Netherlands and the United Kingdom.

Winners

References

External links 
 International Academy of Television Arts and Sciences website

International Emmy Kids Awards ceremonies
International Emmy Kids Awards
International Emmy Kids Awards
International Emmy Kids Awards
International Emmy Kids Awards
International Emmy Kids Awards